Tabanović is a village situated in the Mionica municipality in Serbia.

References

Populated places in Kolubara District